Alan Lewis Jones (born 1 June 1957) is a former Welsh cricketer. Jones was a left-handed batsman. He was born at Alltwen, Glamorgan. Because his cricket career coincided largely with that of a different Alan Jones, also an opening batsman for Glamorgan but of longer standing and greater prominence, he was generally known by his full name of "Alan Lewis Jones".

References

External links
Alan Jones at ESPNcricinfo
Alan Jones at CricketArchive

1957 births
Living people
Cricketers from Neath Port Talbot
Welsh cricketers
Glamorgan cricketers
Wales National County cricketers